Amrduiyeh (also Romanized as Amrdū’īyeh and Amrodū’īyeh; also known as Amrūdū’īyeh and Hūrmedū) is a village in Meymand Rural District, in the Central District of Shahr-e Babak County, Kerman Province, Iran. At the 2006 census, its population was 322, in 73 families.

References 

Populated places in Shahr-e Babak County